Haifa Guedri (born 19 January 1989) is a Tunisian former footballer and current manager. She played as an attacking midfielder and has been a member of the Tunisia women's national team.

Club career
Guedri has played for ASF Sahel and Tunis Air Club in Tunisia.

International career
Guedri capped for Tunisia at senior level during the 2008 African Women's Championship.

International goals
Scores and results list Tunisia's goal tally first

See also
List of Tunisia women's international footballers

References

External links

1989 births
Living people
Footballers from Tunis
Tunisian women's footballers
Women's association football midfielders
Tunisia women's international footballers
Tunisian football managers
Women's association football managers
Female association football managers
20th-century Tunisian women
21st-century Tunisian women